Cossignano is a comune (municipality) in the Province of Ascoli Piceno in the Italian region Marche, located about  south of Ancona and about  northeast of Ascoli Piceno.

The municipality of Cossignano contains the frazione (subdivision) Ponte.

Cossignano borders the following municipalities: Carassai, Castignano, Montalto delle Marche, Offida, Ripatransone.

Demographic evolution

References

External links
 www.provincia.ap.it/Cossignano

Cities and towns in the Marche